Geoffrey Lloyd (born 11 September 1951), also known by the nickname of "Sammy"  (after his father Samuel "Sammy" Lloyd), is an English former professional rugby league footballer who played as a  or  in the 1960s and 1970s.

He played at representative level for Great Britain (non-Test matches) and Yorkshire, and at club level for Castleford (Heritage No. 532) and Hull FC as a right-footed round the corner style (rather than toe-end style) goal-kicker during the era of contested scrums.

In 1978, Lloyd was transferred from Castleford to Hull F.C. for a transfer-fee of £12,000 (based on increases in average earnings, this would be approximately £106,900 in 2014). In his first home game for the club, he converted 14 goals in a 61–10 victory over Oldham, equalling Jim Kennedy's club record for the most goals scored in a single match. The record was subsequently also equalled by Matt Crowther, who is coincidentally Lloyd's nephew.

Background
Sammy Lloyd's birth was registered in Barkston Ash district, West Riding of Yorkshire, England.

Playing career

International honours
Sammy Lloyd was selected for Great Britain's 1977 Rugby League World Cup squad, he played in a pre-tournament warm-up match, and sustained a knee injury, against New Zealand Māori, at Huntly, New Zealand, consequently he played in none of the World Cup matches, although he did later play in two midweek tour matches against club/county/region/state teams in Townsville, North Queensland and Gosford, New South Wales.

County honours
Sammy Lloyd won caps for Yorkshire while at Castleford playing left-, i.e. number 11, in the 12–12 draw with Cumberland at Whitehaven's stadium on 15 February 1977, and was an interchange/substitute, i.e. number 14, in the 18–15 victory over Lancashire at Castleford's stadium on 1 March 1977.

Challenge Cup Final appearances
Sammy Lloyd played right-, i.e. number 12, in Hull FC's 5–10 defeat by Hull Kingston Rovers in the 1980 Challenge Cup Final during the 1979–80 season at Wembley Stadium, London on Saturday 3 May 1980, in front of a crowd of 95,000, played right-, i.e. number 12 (Lee Crooks played in the replay), and scored 4-goals in the 14–14 draw with Widnes in the 1982 Challenge Cup Final during the 1981–82 season at Wembley Stadium, London on Saturday 1 May 1982, in front of a crowd of 92,147.

County Cup Final appearances
Sammy Lloyd played , and scored 5-goals in Castleford's 17–7 victory over Featherstone Rovers in the 1977 Yorkshire County Cup Final during the 1977–78 season at Headingley Rugby Stadium, Leeds on Saturday 15 October 1977.

BBC2 Floodlit Trophy Final appearances
Sammy Lloyd played right-, i.e. number 12, and scored 3-goals in Castleford's 12–4 victory over Leigh in the 1976 BBC2 Floodlit Trophy Final during the 1976-77 season at Hilton Park, Leigh on Tuesday 14 December 1976.

Player's No.6 Trophy Final appearances
Sammy Lloyd played right-, i.e. number 12, and scored 5-goals in Castleford's 25–15 victory over Blackpool Borough in the 1976–77 Player's No.6 Trophy Final during the 1976-77 season at The Willows, Salford on Saturday 22 January 1977.

Genealogical information
Sammy Lloyd is the son of Samuel Lloyd and Mary (née Milner, marriage registered during third ¼ 1938 in Tadcaster district), and the younger brother of Malcolm, Melvyn and Nora Lloyd, and older brother of Christine M. Lloyd.

References

External links
Geoff Lloyd Memory Box Search at archive.castigersheritage.com
Sammy Lloyd Memory Box Search at archive.castigersheritage.com

1951 births
Living people
Castleford Tigers players
English rugby league players
Great Britain national rugby league team players
Hull F.C. players
Place of birth missing (living people)
Rugby league locks
Rugby league players from Yorkshire
Rugby league second-rows
Rugby league wingers
Yorkshire rugby league team players